Aycan is a Turkish name, and it may refer to:

Given name
Aycan Önel (born 1933), Turkish sprinter
Aycan Yanaç (born 1998), Turkish-German footballer
Aycan Yurtsever, Turkish-Canadian physicist

Surname
Sefer Aycan (born 1963), Turkish physician of public health, academics, former Undersecretary of Turkish Health Ministry and politician

See also
Aycan, Danish dance & techno Music group.